Laura González may refer to:
 Laura González (rugby union)
 Laura González (Miss Colombia)
 Laura G, Mexican television presenter and journalist